Tall Shair is a village in northern Aleppo Governorate, northern Syria.

Tall Shair administratively belongs to Nahiya Jarabulus within Jarabulus District. Nearby localities include al-Hajaliyah  to the north, and Haymar  to the southwest.

References

Populated places in Jarabulus District